Øm Abbey (Øm Kloster) was a Cistercian monastery founded in 1172 in the Diocese of Aarhus near the town of Rye, between the lakes of Mossø and  Gudensø  in central Jutland, Denmark. It is one of many former monasteries and abbeys in the highland region of Søhøjlandet.

History 

The Øm Abbey Chronicle (Øm Klosters krønike) was written by local monks from 1206 to 1267 when it abruptly ends.  It outlines events at the abbey during the tumultuous years of the early 13th century.

According to the Øm Abbey Chronicle, Øm Abbey was founded in 1172 by Cistercian monks from Vitskøl Abbey in northern Jutland. They wanted to found a daughter house in central Jutland.  They attempted to establish such a house at Sabro near Aarhus but found the soil useless for farming.  They moved to the area of the  Sming  forest near Silkeborg but found the same poor soil conditions. In 1166 they settled a short time at abandoned Veng Abbey, outside Skanderborg. They left in 1167 because of unresolved land disputes with Lady Margrethe. They tried for four years to establish themselves at Kalvø in Lake Skanderborg, but the winters proved to be too harsh. The monks finally settled on a patch of land in the parish of Gammel Rye  between the lakes Mossø and Gudensø, surrounded by water and marshlands. The site was overgrown with brush and surrounded by forest.

Bishop Svend of Aarhus transferred many of his own holdings to Øm Abbey and then retired there to live out his days among the monks. He was buried in front of the high altar. Abbot Michael, the twelfth abbot, was buried in the chapter room in the unfinished church. Bishop Peder Elafssen of Aarhus was buried in the church in 1246, years before it was completed. Abbot Jens (1246–1249) was wounded while trying to prevent bandits from stealing horses from the abbey.

The second abbey church was completed in 1257 built of red bricks, the most common building material of the day in the region. It was built in late Gothic style, with a nave and a transept, but had an irregular shape.

One event which caused trouble for Øm Abbey was the suspicion that the monks harbored Abbot Arnfast of Ryd Abbey who was accused of having murdered King Christopher I of Denmark by giving him poisoned communion wine during mass at Ribe Cathedral in 1259.  Abbot Arnfast was supposed to have poisoned the king for his persecution of Archbishop Jacob Erlandsen.  A thorough search failed to produce Arnfast, who had fled the country.  Christopher's son, King Eric V had  the Cistercians banished.

In 1260 King Christopher's widow Dowager Queen Margaret Sambiria stayed at the abbey for two days with an army of 1,600 knights.  The chronicle bemoans on the heavy cost of such a royal visit.

The next two Bishops of Aarhus, Tyge and Peder, were not kindly disposed to Øm Abbey. They reclaimed some of the properties given by earlier bishops. They also claimed the right of hospitality at the abbey for themselves and their followers, which angered the monks.  The Cistercians continued to support  Jacob Erlandsen, Archbishop of Lund in his struggle with King Eric V of Denmark.

At its height in the late 15th century, the abbey consisted of the church, hospital and hospital cemetery, library, chapter house, refectory, dormitory, cloister and cloister garden, and a guest house. The abbey measured approximately 120 meters by 80 meters. It was one of Denmark's richest houses with land holdings, mills, and a well-recognized hospital. Cistercians were excellent farmers and over time the abbey came into possession of many properties which brought additional income and prestige.

One of the important improvement the monks made to the site was to build three canals.  Brother Martin discovered that Moss Lake was about a cubit higher than Lake Guden. The monks used that difference to build two canals near the abbey, one to bring fresh water to the abbey and a second to serve as a primitive sewerage system. The third canal built farther away from the abbey connected the two lakes and was used to transport goods through the lake region.

The abbey prospered especially during and after the reign of Queen Margaret I of Denmark. By 1510 the abbey owned 250 properties all over central Jutland.

Dissolution
The Reformation in Denmark brought about the end of the abbey.  When Denmark became officially Lutheran in 1536, the abbey was allowed to continue operating with the monks already there, but no new monks were to be admitted. In 1560 the last monk was moved to Sorø Abbey on Zealand, and the land and buildings became crown property under Frederik II.  Just a year later, in 1561, Frederik II ordered the buildings to be demolished, and the stone, timber, and bricks used to extend Skanderborg Castle. The land on which the abbey had been located, was divided into four large estates in 1571. 
The village of  Emborg   now surrounds the former site  of the former abbey. The site of Øm Kloster ifmanages by  Øm Kloster Museum, part of the National Museum of Denmark system.  Ruin of the church and chapter hall are visible. Findings  from the excavations of Øm Kloster are on display at the museum.

References

Other Sources
 Brian Patrick McGuire (1976) Conflict and Continuity at Øm Abbey  (Museum Tusculanum Press)

External links
 Øm Abbey Museum  Skanderborg Museum
 The Cistercian Abbey of Øm Abbey at Mossø  Denmarks Cultural Heritage association 

Cistercian monasteries in Denmark
Buildings and structures in Skanderborg Municipality
Churches in the Diocese of Aarhus